West Township is one of the eighteen townships of Columbiana County, Ohio, United States. The 2010 census reported 3,307 people living in the township, 3,305 of whom were in the unincorporated portions of the township.

Geography
Located in the western part of the county, it borders the following townships:
Knox Township - north
Butler Township - northeast corner
Hanover Township - east
East Township, Carroll County - southeast
Augusta Township, Carroll County - south
Brown Township, Carroll County - southwest corner
Paris Township, Stark County - west
Washington Township, Stark County - northwest corner

One village  and one unincorporated community are located in West Township:
The village of Minerva, in the southwest
The unincorporated community of East Rochester, in the south

Name and history

It is the only West Township statewide.

The township was organized in 1814.

Government
The township is governed by a three-member board of trustees, who are elected in November of odd-numbered years to a four-year term beginning on the following January 1. Two are elected in the year after the presidential election and one is elected in the year before it. There is also an elected township fiscal officer, who serves a four-year term beginning on April 1 of the year after the election, which is held in November of the year before the presidential election. Vacancies in the fiscal officership or on the board of trustees are filled by the remaining trustees.

Township Trustees
Dale L. Lowmiller, Chairman
Todd Wright, Vice Chairman
Glenn Whiteleather

Fiscal Officer
Jeff Haynam

References

External links
County website

Townships in Columbiana County, Ohio
Townships in Ohio
1814 establishments in Ohio
Populated places established in 1814